The Flash Legs (Chinese title: 太極八蛟; Cantonese: Tài Gìk Baat Bo. "The Ultimate Eight Feet"), also released as Shaolin Deadly Kicks, is a 1977 Hong Kong martial arts action film directed by Ma Wu and starring Tao-liang Tan and Lo Lieh. The film was later remade as Breathing Fire, with Tao-liang Tan serving as writer and executive producer under the pseudonym of Delon Tanners.

Plot
A gang of robbers known as The Eight Dragons have infiltrated a local residence in an attempt to steal a map. Upon its successful retrieval, when the bandits are about to make their getaway, the lights suddenly flick on, and they are accosted by the owner of the house (the map, presumably, is his as well). The owners of the house are quickly disposed of, and The Eight Dragons make off into the night with their map.

Because of the robbery not being executed as smoothly as planned, The Eight Dragons become paranoid about actually seeking the treasure divulged in the map, and decide to hold off until the heat blows over. So they divide the map into eight pieces, and promise to meet again in three years and collect their fortune.

It isn't too long after the temporary break-up that one of the Dragons (Husky) is arrested in an unrelated robbery as an attempt to cover his extensive tab at the local brothel. In jail, he meets Fong Yee (Tao-liang Tan), and together they devise an ingenious plan to escape. Actually, one of the other prisoners pickpockets a guard, gets the key to the cells, and lets them go.

Approximately ten minutes after their escape, Husky discovers that Fong Yee is actually an undercover cop out to infiltrate The Eight Dragons and recover the map. After killing Husky Dragon, Fong Yee recovers the first piece of the stolen document.

One by one, Fong Yee confronts each member of The Eight Dragons, and for the most part, kills them but gets captured by one of them, however he eventually escapes without the map pieces. Fong returns the next day, disposes of his captors, and recovers their respective pieces of the map. Unfortunately, however, he is stabbed in the process.

With the knife still embedded in his back, Fong Yee wanders into the woods and passes out. He wakes up in the house of the girl (Doris Lung) he previously saved. The recovery process proves slow; Fong not only needs to mend his body, but also regain his kung-fu prowess as well. But unbeknownst to the young couple, her father (Wong Hap), ironically, turns out to be one of the few remaining Eight Dragons, and a final showdown between him and Fong is inevitable. The second in command of the Eight Dragons arrives (Lo Lieh) as the reunion is close. The father chooses to repent and give up the map so that he can live in peace and not reveal his past to his daughter. Lo Lieh kills him and steals the map. Fong Yee and the daughter hunt down Lo Lieh to retrieve the map and achieve revenge.

Cast
 Tao-liang Tan as Fong Yee
 Lo Lieh as Scarred Dragon, member of The Eight Dragons
 Wong Hap as Chief Dragon
 Doris Lung as Jade
 Kam Kong as Chang Fang
 Lo Dik as Doctor, leader of The Eight Dragons
 Tsai Hung as White eyebrows, member of The Eight Dragons
 Ouyang Sha-fei as Chang Fang's mother
 Lung Fei as member of The Eight Dragons
 Tsang Chiu as Chun-Wei

Music
The film's music was composed by Fu Liang Chou under the name of Chow Fook-Leung. Pieces of John Barry's 1974 score to The Man with the Golden Gun can be heard throughout the film.

External links

 
 
 

Kung fu films
Hong Kong martial arts films
1977 films
1970s Hong Kong films